This is a '''list of Dr. Seuss television specials.

References

 
Lists of television specials